Lavinia Tauhalaliku is a Tongan New Zealander rugby league player. She is a former member of the New Zealand women's national rugby league team.

Tauhalaliku has previously played rugby union for Manurewa and the Counties Manukau women's team in 2018 and 2019. In 2019 she was named to the Bolt team in the Red Bull Ignite7.

She played league for the Auckland Vulcans. In October 2020 she was selected for the New Zealand women's national rugby league team for their match against Fetū Samoa.

In June 2022 she was selected for Mate Ma'a Tonga. On 22 June 2022 she was appointed captain of the Tonga women's national rugby league team.

References

Living people
Year of birth missing (living people)
New Zealand female rugby league players
New Zealand women's national rugby league team players
Tongan rugby league players